The South Australian Derby is a South Australian Jockey Club Group 1 Thoroughbred horse race for three-year-olds, at set weights, run over a distance of 2,500 metres at Morphettville Racecourse in Adelaide, Australia during the SAJC Autumn Carnival.

History
The inaugural running of the race was on 5 January 1860 at Thebarton Racecourse which is located today in Mile End. The race was called The Thebarton Derby and had stakes of 100 sovereigns with an additional sweep of 10 sovereigns with a forfeit of 2 sovereigns. The race was won by the famous colonial pastoralist C.B. Fisher's, four-year-old mare Midnight who carried 8 stone 10 pounds and ridden by jockey Simpson in a time of 2:54.

By 1862 the race was simply known as The Derby and in 1866 the Summer meet was held before Christmas Day. For a period of seven years between 1869 and 1875 the race was not held. When the race was resumed in 1876 it was held at Morphettville Racecourse and it was held in September during the SAJC Spring meeting.

The early winner Tim Whiffler is not to be confused with the 1867 Melbourne Cup winner of the same name.

The race attracted many fine horses who would later excel in other prestigious races around the country. 1880 saw The Assyrian, a son of Countryman (GB) win the race and two years later win the Melbourne Cup.

1903 saw the simply named F.J.A. prevail and the son of Wallace would also win a VRC Derby, Toorak Handicap and The All Aged Stakes.

1961 winner Gatum Gatum also went on to win the Melbourne Cup in 1963 while the 1972 winner Dayana was a Perth Cup winner in 1973.

Subzero won the race in 1992 and he would win the Melbourne Cup on a wet track the next season, and also the G1 Adelaide Cup.

The 2009 winner Rebel Raider succeeded after earlier he won the VRC Derby.

Fillies have also had some success in the race. Most recently Delicacy completed the Australasian Oaks–SA Derby double in 2015.

Distance
1860–1971 –  miles (~2400 metres)
1972 – 2400 metres
1973–1977 – 2500 metres
1978–1979 – 2400 metres
1980 – 2600 metres
1981–1985 – 2500 metres
1986–2004 – 2400 metres
2005 onwards – 2500 metres

Winners

 2022 - Jungle Magnate
 2021 - Explosive Jack
 2020 – Russian Camelot 
 2019 – Qafila
 2018 – Leicester
 2017 – Volatile Mix
 2016 – Howard Be Thy Name
 2015 – Delicacy
 2014 – Kushadasi
 2013 – Escado
 2012 – Zabeelionaire
 2011 – Shadows In The Sun
 2010 – Kidnapped
 2009 – Rebel Raider
 2008 – Zarita
 2007 – Lazer Sharp
 2006 – Testifiable
 2005 – Tails Of Triomphe
 2004 – Hard To Get
 2003 – Mummify
 2002 – Pantani
 2001 – Big Pat
 2000 – Blue Murder
 1999 – Showella
 1998 – Bulta
 1997 – Markham
 1996 – Cheviot
 1995 – Count Chivas
 1994 – Bullwinkle
 1993 – Our Pompeii
 1992 – Subzero
 1991 – Shiva's Revenge
 1990 – Diego
 1989 – Sea Brigand
 1988 – Celtic Spirit
 1987 – Shark's Fin
 1986 – French Cotton
 1985 – Sir Zephyr
 1984 – Mapperley Heights
 1983 – ¶race not held
 1982 – English Wonder 
 1981 – Brewery Boy 
 1980 – Tasman 
 1979 – Top Ware 
 1978 – Regal Jester 
 1977 – Stormy Rex 
 1976 – Vacuum 
 1975 – Prince Of All 
 1974 – Exalt's Pride 
 1973 – Sir Gerald 
 1972 – Dayana 
 1971 – Near Boy 
 1970 – Clear Prince 
 1969 – Paradigm 
 1968 – Dale Lace 
 1967 – Kembla
 1966 – Peculator 
 1965 – Mission 
 1964 – Ziema 
 1963 – Hunting Horn 
 1962 – Royal Ziet 
 1961 – Gatum Gatum 
 1960 – Royal Chat 
 1959 – Crusty Bottle 
 1958 – Stormy Passage 
 1957 – Galloway 
 1956 – Auteuil 
 1955 – Ralkon 
 1954 – Pandie Star 
 1953 – Jovial Scot 
 1952 – Winemaker 
 1951 – Beau Cavalier 
 1950 – Toastmaster 
 1949 – Glenvue 
 1948 – Idle Banter 
 1947 – Basama 
 1946 – Conservator 
 1945 – Dauntless 
 1944 – Bluenor 
1942–43 – † race not held
 1941 – Ladmond 
 1940 – Waxwings 
 1939 – Lusson 
 1938 – Tempest 
 1937 – Golden Hill 
 1936 – Brave Lad 
 1935 – Beamish Boy 
 1934 – Alinura 
 1933 – Yultewirra 
 1932 – Traverse 
 1931 – Opera King 
 1930 – Induna 
 1929 – Hot Spring 
 1928 – Mount Of Olives 
 1927 – Marco Polo 
 1926 – Pindenda 
 1925 – Ethelton 
 1924 – Wycherley 
 1923 – King Of Mirth 
 1922 – Burnished 
 1921 – Leon 
 1920 – Pogonatos 
 1919 – Lord Setay 
 1918 – Stagegirl
 1917 – Cosmos 
 1916 – Nevka 
 1915 – Perambulate 
 1914 – Fidelio 
 1913 – Kildalton 
 1912 – Puringa 
 1911 – Sanskrit 
 1910 – Sergius  
 1909 – The Greek 
 1908 – Tiercel
 1907 – Palotta 
 1906 – Kismet II 
 1905 – Torah 
 1904 – Ganymedes 
 1903 – F.J.A. 
 1902 – Rienzi 
 1901 – Ritualist 
 1900 – Miltiades 
 1899 – Gunga Din 
 1898 – Hainault 
 1897 – Goodwill 
 1896 – Thunder Queen 
 1895 – Auraria
 1894 – Monastery 
 1893 – Salient 
 1892 – Vakeel 
 1891 – Lady Rose 
 1890 – Cheddar 
1885–89 – ‡race not held
 1884 – Gratitude 
 1883 – Dirk Hatteraick 
 1882 – Guesswork 
 1881 – Topaz 
 1880 – The Assyrian
 1879 – Pawnbroker 
 1878 – Viceroy  
 1877 – Irish Queen 
 1876 – Pride Of The Hills 
1869–75 – race not held
 1868 – Centurion 
 1867 – Regalia 
 1866 – Crusader 
 1865 – Tim Whiffler 
 1864 – ♯Queen Of Barossa
 1864 – Lubra 
 1863 – Lord Of Isles 
 1862 – Riddle 
 1861 – Typo 
 1860 – Midnight

¶ Race usually scheduled to be run on second weekend in May was replaced in the racing calendar by Group 3 St Leger Stakes, run over a distance of 2600 metres.
† Race not held due to a ban on war time racing in the state.
‡ Race not held due to the Totalizator Repeal Act 1883.
♯ Race was raced twice in the same calendar year. The 1863–64 racing calendar set the date of the race as 1 January 1864. For the 1864–65 racing calendar the race was held on the first day of SAJC Summer Meet as the third race on 28 December 1864.

See also
 List of Australian Group races
 Group races

References

Flat horse races for three-year-olds
Group 1 stakes races in Australia
Sport in Adelaide
1860 establishments in Australia